Arthur Matthews (1848 – 1911) was a founding professor at Rhodes University in Grahamstown, South Africa.

Early life
Matthews was born in Torquay, England in 1848 to John Redaway and Agnes Mudge Matthews.  He studied at Sidney Sussex College, Cambridge where he obtained the degrees Bachelor of Arts (BA) in 1870 and Master of Arts (MA) in 1873. He later obtained a Bachelor of Science (BSc) degree from the University of London.

South Africa
He came to the Cape Colony in 1875 as the first lecturer in mathematics and physical science at St. Andrew's College, Grahamstown, and later became professor and vice-principal of its College Department. He built up at a Land Survey Department while at St. Andrew's College and trained many of South Africa's early land surveyors, including four Surveyors General.

In 1904 Rhodes University College was established and its first four professors appointed from the staff of St. Andrew's College. One of these was Matthews, who became professor of mathematics and chairman of the university senate.

Matthews retired from Rhodes University in 1910 and died in the Cape Province in 1911.

Works

References

External links

1848 births
1911 deaths
19th-century South African mathematicians
20th-century South African mathematicians
Alumni of Sidney Sussex College, Cambridge
Scientists from Torquay
Academic staff of Rhodes University
British emigrants to South Africa